Ray Middleton (6 September 1919 – 1977) was an English football goalkeeper and manager, and brother of Matt Middleton.

Born in Boldon Colliery Middleton began his career at North Shields where he attracted the attentions of Chesterfield who signed him for £50. He established himself as first choice keeper but saw his career interrupted by World War II, remaining in the area to work as a miner during the conflict. Highly rated as a player despite not playing top-flight football, he appeared four times for England B and, unusually given their Second Division status, played alongside clubmate Stanley Milburn in one fixture. Off the pitch Middleton ran a grocer shop in Old Whittington and became involved in local Labour Party politics, even becoming the only active Football League player to serve as a Justice of the Peace.

The Spireites' relegation in 1951 saw him leave the club to move to top-flight Derby County, where he made 115 appearances. Released by the club in 1954 he moved to non-league Boston United as a player-manager, even leading the club to a famous 6–1 win over Derby in the FA Cup.

He attracted the attention of Hartlepool United who appointed him as their manager in 1957. He began promisingly with a 2–1 win over Accrington Stanley although his record proved mediocre and after a 5–1 defeat at Doncaster Rovers in October 1959 he left the club.

Middleton returned to Boston, initially for a spell as manager before taking up the post of secretary. He held this position until his death in 1977.

References

1919 births
1977 deaths
English footballers
North Shields F.C. players
Derby County F.C. players
Boston United F.C. players
English Football League players
England B international footballers
English football managers
Boston United F.C. managers
Hartlepool United F.C. managers
British businesspeople in retailing
English legal professionals
English miners
Labour Party (UK) politicians
People from Old Whittington
Footballers from Derbyshire
People from The Boldons
Footballers from Tyne and Wear
Association football goalkeepers
British sportsperson-politicians